Events from the year 1767 in Russia

Incumbents
 Monarch – Catherine II

Events

 
 Dzelzava Manor
 Kambarka Engineering Works
 St Andrew's Church, Kiev

Births
 13 April - Artemy Vedel, composer (died 1808)

Deaths

References

1767 in Russia
Years of the 18th century in the Russian Empire